Shanling Township is a township in Qianjiang District, Chongqing, China. , it administers the following two residential neighborhoods and four villages:
Neighborhoods
Shanling
Linfeng

Villages
Fengxiang Village
Xinglong Village
Jianshanzi Village
Kuzhu Village

References 

Township-level divisions of Chongqing